Aosaginohi, or Aosagibi ("blue heron fire") is a phenomenon illustrated by Toriyama Sekien in his Konjaku Gazu Zoku Hyakki. It depicts a night heron with a mysteriously illuminated body.

Folklore built around the phenomenon tells a story of an old black-crowned night heron transforming into a yokai. The herons' feathers fuse into shining scales that give off an iridescent blue light in the dark of night. The yokai's breath is also said to release golden powder into the air that collects to form a heat-less fiery light, though this light eventually dissipates in the wind. The harmless creature is said to flee from human contact, retaining a normal heron's shyness.

Legend also warns to not confuse the glimmering blue-white light with onibi lights.

References

 
 :ja:青鷺火

Legendary birds
Yōkai

pt:Anexo:Lista de artigos mínimos de Youkais#Ao-sagi-bi